Neocollyris crassicornis is a species of tiger beetles in the genus Neocollyris in the family Carabidae. It was described by Dejean in 1825.

Description
These tiger beetles are very slender, with great ratio of width of pronotum to total body length.

Distribution
This species is present in China, Cambodia, Vietnam and Laos.

References

Crassicornis, Neocollyris
Beetles described in 1825